German-South Korean relations were established in the 1950s and play a vital role in the foreign policy of both countries today.

Historical background 
The Korean state of Joseon first established diplomatic relations with the German Empire under the Germany–Korea Treaty of 1883 which remained in effect even after in 1905.

In 1955, West Germany officially recognized South Korea as a sovereign state.

Present situation 
Since the German reunification of 1990, much effort has been undertaken by both countries to improve diplomatic relations with each other. In the mid-2000s, the Germany–Korea Treaty of 1883 was renewed by both countries and was officially put into effect on December 19, 2008, as a form of commemoration of the 125th anniversary of the original treaty.

On December 20, 2012, the German chancellor Angela Merkel congratulated Park Geun-hye on her appointment as President of South Korea and invited her to make an official visit to Germany. Both politicians stressed the importance of furthering and strengthening the "traditionally very good ties" between the two countries. Merkel has also vowed to assist in the potential challenges of any future Korean reunification, since Germany underwent a reunification itself.

See also 
 Foreign relations of Germany
 Foreign relations of South Korea

References

 
South Korea
Bilateral relations of South Korea
South